Soe Moe (born 31 July 1974) is a Burmese politician who currently serves as a House of Nationalities member of parliament for Ayeyarwady Region № 1 constituency. He is a member of the National League for Democracy.

Early life and education 
Soe Moe was born in Pathein on 31 July 1974. He studied Technological University, Pathein and graduated with L.L.B, C.B.L, AGTI (MP). Then, he worked lawyer of the Supreme Court of Myanmar.

Political career
He is a member of the National League for Democracy Party, he was elected as an Amyotha Hluttaw MP, winning a majority of 171354 votes and elected representative from Ayeyawady Region № 1
parliamentary constituency.

References

1974 births
Living people
People from Ayeyarwady Region
Members of the House of Nationalities
National League for Democracy politicians